A reference collection is a collection of objects maintained for the purpose of study and authentication. Reference collections are generally large undertakings maintained by institutions; instead of having a single representative of each object, they will typically have multiples, so as to illustrate variations and, sometimes, provide samples for comparisons. For human-created objects such as postage stamps or coins, a reference collection may also include an assortment of fakes and forgeries.

Since the purpose is study rather than personal gratification or display, a reference collection values damaged objects as much as the pristine; in fact, organizations maintaining reference collections will encourage members to donate their damaged or poor-condition items to the collection.

In biology, reference collections, such as herbaria are a source of information about variations of populations within a species. They are also the repository of holotypes used as the official definition of species.

In philately, reference collections are critical to expertization, since the characteristics differentiating authentic stamps from reprints, fakes, and forgeries are often too subtle to be described verbally.

References

Collecting

de:Präsenzbestand